Known band organ models  once produced by the Rudolph Wurlitzer Company of North Tonawanda, New York, USA and information regarding currently active models and their locations include:

See also

 Rudolph Wurlitzer Company
 North Tonawanda Barrel Organ Factory

References

Band Organs
Wurlitzer band organs